Missing Songs is a compilation album by the British indie rock band Maxïmo Park comprising B-sides and demos previously available only on British released singles. 

The cover of John Lennon's song "Isolation" was also featured as part of a multi-artist compilation CD "John Lennon Covered", which was given away with an issue of Q Magazine.

Track listing

References

2006 compilation albums
Maxïmo Park albums
Warp (record label) compilation albums
Albums produced by Paul Epworth
B-side compilation albums